The Jupiters were a Pakistani music band who are considered one of the pioneers of pop music in Pakistan. Although the band released only a few albums, it became a breeding ground for many notable future singers. The hit song "Yaaro Yehi Dosti Hai" sung by one of the vocalists Ali Azmat topped the charts in the early 1990s, and is still a famous number.

The band disbanded in the late 1990s and is remembered as a party band in the city of Lahore. The drummer-cum-composer developed an A. R. Rahman type persona and became the driving force behind several hits by Rahat Fateh Ali Khan.

Notable members
 Ali Azmat, the future lead singer of Sufi/rock band Junoon
 Jawad Ahmad, later became a pop singer in Pakistan
 Bilal Hafeez,  founder of the band and lead singer (song -"Saray Gidhay Wich")
 Shakir Awan, band's drummer after Bagga left. He remained associated with the band until its dissolution.
 Irfan Kiani, lead singer, brother of Hadiqa Kiani
 Amir Munawar, lead singer, well-known music composer
 Tahir Saqi, lead singer
 Shahzad Ahmed, last lead singer before the band collapsed
 Kamran Rashid

See also 
 List of Pakistani music bands

References

Musical groups from Lahore
Pakistani rock music groups
Pakistani musical groups